Getting to Know the General is a travel book and volume of autobiography by Graham Greene, published in 1984.

Summary
Greene was summoned in 1976 to meet Omar Torrijos, who served as Commander of the Panamanian National Guard and was de facto head of Panama from 1968 to his death in 1981, as Torrijos felt that Greene would be friendly towards his aim of setting up a social democratic state which was independent of both the United States and the Soviet Union. Greene already had a keen interest in Latin America, as shown in The Power and the Glory and The Honorary Consul. He befriended Torrijos and his bodyguard, José de Jesús Martínez. Travelling through Panama he visited towns and villages and met Daniel Ortega, who became president of Nicaragua in 1985 and Cayetano Carpio, the revolutionary who killed himself in 1983 during the writing. 

Greene went with Gabriel García Márquez to the signing of the Torrijos-Carter Treaties in 1977 on his yearly visits to Panama and wrote of his impressions of Augusto Pinochet and other South American leaders, as well as giving an account of his own experiences in Panama.

Greene discusses the death of Torrijos in a plane crash in 1981, which has never been fully explained, and may have been caused by a pilot error or an assassination. Although he had planned to write a novel called 'On the Way Back', he decided to turn his learning into a factual book.  Some 
of the ‘On the Way Back’ ideas were later worked into The Captain and the Enemy.

References

1984 books
Books by Graham Greene